Michael David Kracalik [KRAH-cha-lik] (born September 8, 1982) is a former American football offensive tackle. He was signed by the New York Jets as an undrafted free agent in 2005. He played college football at San Diego State.

Kracalik has also been a member of the Baltimore Ravens, Rhein Fire, and Las Vegas Locomotives.

External links
Just Sports Stats
San Diego State Aztecs bio

1982 births
Living people
Players of American football from San Diego
American football offensive tackles
San Diego State Aztecs football players
New York Jets players
Baltimore Ravens players
Rhein Fire players
Las Vegas Locomotives players